Fars Province, also known as Pars Province as well as Persis (the origin of the name "Persia"), is one of the 31 provinces of Iran. With an area of 122,400 km², it is located in Iran's southwest, in Region 2, and its administrative center is Shiraz. Fars province neighbours Bushehr province to the west, Hormozgan province to the south, Kerman and Yazd provinces to the east, Isfahan province to the north, and Kohgiluyeh and Boyer-Ahmad province to the northwest.

At the 2006 census, the province numbered 4,220,721 people in 1,014,690 households. As of the following census in 2011, Fars had a population of 4,596,658 people in 1,250,135 households, of whom 67.6% were registered as urban dwellers (urban/suburbs), 32.1% villagers (small town/rural), and 0.3% nomad tribes. The most recent census in 2016 counted 4,851,274 people in 1,443,027 households.

Fars is the historical homeland of the Persian people. It was the homeland of the Achaemenid and Sasanian Persian dynasties of Iran, who reigned on the throne by the time of the ancient Persian Empires. The ruins of the Achaemenid capitals Pasargadae and Persepolis, among others, demonstrate the ancient history of the region. Due to the historical importance of this region, the entire country has historically been also referred to as Persia in the West. Prior to Arab rule, this region was known as Pars.

Etymology
The names Parsa and Persia originate from this region.

Administrative divisions

Cities 
According to the 2016 census, 3,401,675 people (over 70% of the population of Fars province) live in the following cities: Abadeh 59,116, Abadeh Tashk 7,379, Ahel 3,179, Alamarvdasht 4,068, Ardakan 14,633, Arsanjan 17,706, Asir 3,042, Bab Anar 7,061, Baba Monir 1,379, Bahman 7,568, Baladeh 5,972, Banaruiyeh 9,077, Beyram 7,300, Beyza 7,252, Darab 70,232, Darian 10,037, Dehram 3,468, Dezhkord 3,924, Do Borji 2,907, Dobiran 13,809, Duzeh 1,348, Efzar 2,657, Emad Deh 4,235, Emam Shahr 5,803, Eqlid 44,341, Eshkanan 9,115, Estahban 36,410, Evaz 19,987, Fadami 4,097, Farashband 20,320, Fasa 110,825, Firuzabad 65,417, Galleh Dar 13,448, Gerash 34,469, Hajjiabad 21,675, Hamashahr 3,852, Hasanabad 2,045, Hesami 3,131, Ij 6,246, Izadkhast 5,910, Jahrom 141,634, Jannat Shahr 13,598, Juyom 8,010, Kamfiruz 3,713, Karzin 8,841, Kavar 31,711, Kazerun 96,683, Khaneh Zenyan 4,027, Khaniman 3,020, Khavaran 4,332, Kherameh 18,477, Khesht 9,599, Khonj 19,217, Khumeh Zar 6,220, Khur 7,338, Khuzi 3,245, Konartakhteh 6,081, Korehi 3,954, Kuhenjan 3,281, Kupon 3,237, Lamerd 29,380, Lapui 8,985, Lar 62,045, Latifi 7,300, Madar-e Soleyman 1,546, Marvdasht 148,858, Masiri 9,031, Mazayjan 3,567, Meshkan 4,617, Meymand 10,120, Miyan Deh 5,912, Mobarakabad 4,707, Mohr 7,784, Neyriz 49,850, Now Bandegan 2,410, Nowdan 2,892, Nujin 3,769, Nurabad 57,058, Qaderabad 14,973, Qaemiyeh 26,918, Qarah Bulaq 6,772, Qatruyeh 2,895, Qir 20,010, Qotbabad 7,476, Ramjerd 2,550, Runiz 5,760, Saadat Shahr 17,131, Safashahr 26,933, Sarvestan 18,187, Sedeh 6,747, Seyyedan 8,574, Shahr-e Pir 8,927, Shahr-e Sadra 91,863, Sheshdeh 5,960, Shiraz 1,565,572, Soghad 12,582, Soltanabad 1,928, Surian 9,776, Surmaq 3,050, Varavi 4,622, Zahedshahr 9,719, and Zarqan 32,261.

Most populous cities

The following sorted table lists the most populous cities in Fars according to the 2016 census results announced by the Statistical Center of Iran.

Demographics
The main ethnic group in the province consists of Persians (including Larestani people and the Basseri), while Qashqai, Lurs, Arabs, Kurds, Georgians, and Circassians constitute minorities.

Due to the geographical characteristics of Fars and its proximity to the Persian Gulf, Fars has long been a residing area for various peoples and rulers of Iran. However, the tribes of Fars including, Mamasani Lurs, Khamseh and Kohkiluyeh have kept their native and unique cultures and lifestyles which constitute part of the cultural heritage of Iran attracting many tourists. Kurdish tribes include Uriad, Zangana, Chegini, Kordshuli and Kuruni.

Among the hundreds of thousands of Georgians and Circassians that were transplanted to Persia under Shah Abbas I, his predecessors, and successors, a certain amount of them were to guard the main caravan routes; many were settled around Āspās and other villages along the old Isfahan-Shiraz road. By now the vast majority Caucasians that were settled in Fars have lost their cultural, linguistic, and religious identity, having mostly being assimilated into the population.

History

Persis

The ancient Persians were present in the region from about the 10th century BC, and became the rulers of the largest empire the world had yet seen under the Achaemenid dynasty which was established in the mid 6th century BC, at its peak stretching from Thrace-Macedonia, Bulgaria-Paeonia and Eastern Europe proper in the west, to the Indus Valley in its far east. The ruins of Persepolis and Pasargadae, two of the four capitals of the Achaemenid Empire, are located in Fars.

The Achaemenid Empire was defeated by Alexander the Great in 333 BC, incorporating most of their vast empire. Shortly after this the Seleucid Empire was established. However, it never extended its power in Fars beyond the main trade routes, and by the reign of Antiochus I or possibly later Persis emerged as an independent state that minted its own coins.

The Seleucid Empire was subsequently defeated by the Parthians in 238 BC, but by 205 BC, the Seleucid king Antiochus III had extended his authority into Persis and it ceased to be an independent state.

Babak was the ruler of a small town called Kheir. Babak's efforts in gaining local power at the time escaped the attention of Artabanus IV, the Parthian Arsacid Emperor of the time. Babak and his eldest son Shapur I managed to expand their power over all of Persis.

The subsequent events are unclear. Following the death of Babak around 220, Ardashir who at the time was the governor of Darabgird, got involved in a power struggle of his own with his elder brother Shapur. The sources tell us that in 222, Shapur was killed when the roof of a building collapsed on him.

At this point, Ardashir moved his capital further to the south of Persis and founded a capital at Ardashir-Khwarrah (formerly Gur, modern day Firouzabad). After establishing his rule over Persis, Ardashir I rapidly extended the territory of his Sassanid Persian Empire, demanding fealty from the local princes of Fars, and gaining control over the neighboring provinces of Kerman, Isfahan, Susiana, and Mesene.

Artabanus marched a second time against Ardashir I in 224. Their armies clashed at Hormizdegan, where Artabanus IV was killed. Ardashir was crowned in 226 at Ctesiphon as the sole ruler of Persia, bringing the 400-year-old Parthian Empire to an end, and starting the virtually equally long rule of the Sassanian Empire, over an even larger territory, once again making Persia a leading power in the known world, only this time along with its arch-rival and successor to Persia's earlier opponents (the Roman Republic and the Roman Empire); the Byzantine Empire.

The Sassanids ruled for 425 years, until the Muslim armies conquered the empire. Afterwards, the Persians started to convert to Islam, this making it much easier for the new Muslim empire to continue the expansion of Islam.

Persis then passed hand to hand through numerous dynasties, leaving behind numerous historical and ancient monuments; each of which has its own values as a world heritage, reflecting the history of the province, Iran, and West Asia. The ruins of Bishapur, Persepolis, and Firouzabad are all reminders of this. The Arab invaders brought about an end to centuries Zoroastrian political and cultural dominance over the region; supplanted as the faith of the ruling class in the 7th century by Islam, which and over the next 200 years gradually expanded to include a majority of the population.

Climate and wildlife
There are three distinct climatic regions in the Fars Province. First, the mountainous area of the north and northwest with moderate cold winters and mild summers. Secondly, the central regions, with relatively rainy mild winters, and hot dry summers. The third region located in the south and southeast has cold winters with hot summers. The average temperature of Shiraz is 16.8 °C, ranging between 4.7 °C and 29.2 °C.

The geographical and climatic variation of the province causes varieties of plants; consequently, variation of wildlife has been formed in the province. Additional to the native animals of the province, many kinds of birds migrate to the province every year. Many kinds of ducks, storks and swallows migrate to this province in an annual parade. The main native animals of the province are gazelle, deer, mountain wild goat, ram, ewe and many kinds of birds. In the past, like in Khuzestan Plain, the Persian lion had occurred here.

The province of Fars includes many protected wildlife zones. The most important protected zones are:
 Toot Siah (Black Berry) Hunt Forbidden Zone, which is located at the end of Boanat region.
 Basiran Hunt Forbidden Zone, which is located 4 kilometers south to Abadeh;
 Bamu National Park, which is located north-east of Shiraz;
 Estahban Forest Park (Parke Jangaly), which is located on the outskirts of Touraj mountain;
 Hermoodlar Protected Zone, which is located east to Larestan.

Arjan Meadow  and Lake Parishan  are designated Wetlands of International Importance under the Ramsar convention.

Economy
Agriculture is of great importance in Fars. The major products include cereal (wheat and barley), citrus fruits, dates, sugar beets and cotton. Fars has major petrochemical facilities, along with an oil refinery, a factory for producing tires, a large electronics industry, and a sugar mill. Tourism is also a large industry in the province. UNESCO has designated an area in the province, called Arzhan (known as Dasht e Arjan) as a biosphere reserve. Shiraz, provincial capital of Fars, is the namesake of Shirazi wine. A large number of wine factories existed in the city.

Transportation
Shiraz Airport is the main international airport of the province and the second in the country. The cities of Jahrom, Lar and Lamerd also have airports linking them with Shiraz and Tehran and nearby Persian Gulf countries such as the UAE and Bahrain. Shiraz is along the main route from Tehran to southern Iran.

Higher education
The Fars Province is home to many higher education institutes and universities. The main universities of the province include Shiraz University, Shiraz University of Arts, Shiraz University of Medical Sciences, Shiraz University of Technology, Jahrom University, Jahrom University of Medical Sciences, Fasa University of Medical Sciences, Islamic Azad University of Shiraz and Islamic Azad University of Jahrom.

Notable people

 

 Cyrus the Great, Founder of the Achaemenian Empire
 Ardashir the Unifier, Founder of the Sassanian Empire
 Karim Khan, founder of the Zand dynasty.
 Lotf Ali Khan, the last ruler of the Zand dynasty.
 Saadi, writer, poet, born and died in Shiraz.
 Hafez Shirazi, poet, born and died in Shiraz.
 Barbad, the Persian musician of the Sassanid era, born in Jahrom
 Mulla Sadra an Iranian Shia Islamic philosopher and theologian.
 Qotb al-Din Kazeruni was born in Kazerun.
 Mansur Hallaj, Persian mystic, killed in the 9th century AD.
 Salman the Persian, a companion of the Islamic prophet Muhammad and the first Persian who converted to Islam.
 Gholamhossein Saber, artist.
 Reza Malekzadeh was born in Kazerun.
 Christiane Amanpour's father is originally from Sarvestan, Fars.
 Sibawayh, one of the founders of Arabic grammar, died in Shiraz.
 Hakim Salman Jahromi, The special doctor of Abbas the Great was from Jahrom
 Ibn Muqaffa, or Ruzbeh Dadwayh, Persian writer and translator from the 8th century AD.
 Zahra Kazemi, photographer, born in Shiraz.
 Ladan and Laleh Bijani, famous conjoined twins, born in Shiraz.
 Khwaju Kermani, buried in Shiraz.
 Jamshid Amouzegar
 Seyyed Zia'eddin Tabatabaee was born in Shiraz.
 Ibn Khafif, a 9th-century sage, is buried in Shiraz.
 Sheikh Ruzbehan
 Afshin Ghotbi, Football Manager of Iranian National Team
 Meulana Shahin Shirazi, Persian Jewish poet and wiseman.
 Junayd Shirazi
 Mohsen Kadivar
 Ata'ollah Mohajerani was a representative of Shiraz in the Majlis.
 Saeed Emami
 Gholam Reza Azhari
 Siyyid Mírzá 'Alí-Muhammad, the Báb
 Mohammad Hashem Pesaran, the most honored Iranian economist.
 Firouz Naderi, an Iranian-American scientist and the Associate Director of NASA's Jet Propulsion Laboratory (JPL), responsible for Project Formulation and Strategy. He was born in Shiraz.
 Ebrahim Golestan, filmmaker and literary figure
 Kaveh Golestan, photojournalist and artist.
 Habibollah Peyman, Iranian politician
 Mohsen Safaei Farahani, Iranian politician
 Simin Daneshvar, academic, renowned novelist, fiction writer and translator

References

Bibliography

External links

 Province of Fars on Iran Chamber Society
  (Bibliography)
 Fars Tourist Attractions

 
Provinces of Iran